Myrothamnus moschata is a plant species in the genus Myrothamnus.

References 

Gunnerales